Film Cuts is an album released by the Irish musical group The Chieftains in 1996. The album is a collection of music by The Chieftains used in the motion picture soundtracks of Rob Roy, Circle of Friends, Treasure Island, Barry Lyndon, Lovespell a.k.a. Tristan and Isolde, The Grey Fox, Far and Away, and a documentary: Ireland Moving.

Track listing
Rob Roy: O'Sullivan's March - 4:03 
Circle of Friends: Dublin - 2:32 
Circle of Friends: Air- You're the One - 3:51 
Treasure Island: Opening Theme - 1:03 
Treasure Island: Loyals March -  1:51 
Treasure Island: Island Theme -  2:32 
Treasure Island: Setting Sail -  2:37 
Treasure Island: French Leave -  1:51 
Treasure Island: Blind Pew -  2:10 
Treasure Island: Treasure Cave -  2:12 
Treasure Island: The Hispanola/Silver and Loyals March -  3:06 
Barry Lyndon: Love Theme - 3:31 
Tristan and Isolde: Love Theme- 2:17 
Tristan and Isolde: The Falcon - 1:37 
Tristan and Isolde: The Departure - 3:23 
The Grey Fox: Main Theme -  6:03 
Far and Away: Fighting for Dough - 2:04 
Ireland Moving: Ireland Moving-Train Sequence - 1:43

Musicians
Derek Bell - Irish harp, tiompan, harpsichord
Martin Fay - violin, bones
Seán Keane - violin
Matt Molloy - flute
Paddy Moloney - Uilleann pipes, flute
Kevin Conneff - bodhrán

Sources and links

 

1996 compilation albums
The Chieftains albums
RCA Records compilation albums